The 2006–07 Azadegan League season.

Group A

Group B

Top goal scorers

11
  Farhad Kheirkhah (Sorkhpooshan)

Group A 

10
  Matin Bigdeli (Shirin Faraz)
8
  Amin Mohtashami (Pegah Gilan)
6
  Ruhollah Rezaei (Moghavemat Basij)
  Saeed Pirtandib (Esteghlal Dezful)
  Ali Hadad (Shamoushak)
5
  Ali Mombini (Moghavemat Basij)
  Ghasem Salmani (Etka)

Group B

11
  Farhad Kheirkhah (Sorkhpooshan)
9
  Hamidreza Khedmatkari (Shahrdari Bandar Abbas)
8
  Abbas Asadi (Tose'eh Rouy)
7
  Behrouz Pakniat (Sanaye Arak)
  Mohammad Sahimi (Payam Mashhad)
  Asghar Nadali (Nassaji)
  Bahador Abdi (Sorkhpooshan)

Promotion playoffs

First Legs
(May 3, Yadegare Imam Stadium, Tabriz; att: 65,000)
Tractor Sazi           1–2 Shirin Faraz
(May 3, Bandar Abbas)
Shahrdari Banadar Abbas 0–0 Pegah Gilan

Second Legs
(May 12, Enghelab Stadium, Kermanshah)
Shirin Faraz     2–1 Tractor Sazi

(May 12, Azodi Stadium, Rasht; att: 25000)
Pegah Gilan      2–0 Shahrdari Banadar Abbas

Pegah Gilan and Shirin Faraz advance to the Persian Gulf Cup

2nd stage promotion playoffs

First Legs June 10
Foolad          1–0 Tractor Sazi 
Rah Ahan        2–0 Shahrdari Bandar Abbas

Second Legs June 16
Tractor Sazi           0–1  Foolad  
Shahrdari Banadar Abbas 0–3 Rah Ahan

Foolad and Rah Ahan play each other for final Persian Gulf Cup spot

Final Leg
(June 22, Naghshe Jahan Stadium, Esfahan)
Rah Ahan 1–0 Foolad

Rah Ahan FC remains in the Persian Gulf Cup while Foolad FC is relegated to the Azadegan League.

Azadegan League champions   : Shirin Faraz Gharb
Relegated to 2nd division   : Deihim Ahvaz, Kesht-o-Sanat Shushtar
Promoted to the IPL         : Pegah Gilan, Sanat Naft, Shirin Faraz Gharb
Promoted from 2nd division  : Damash Iranian F.C., Sepahan Novin F.C.

References

Azadegan League seasons
Iran
2006–07 in Iranian football leagues